Universal prescriptivism (often simply called prescriptivism) is the meta-ethical view that claims that, rather than expressing propositions, ethical sentences function similarly to imperatives which are universalizable—whoever makes a moral judgment is committed to the same judgment in any situation where the same relevant facts pertain.

This makes prescriptivism a universalist form of non-cognitivism. Prescriptivism stands in opposition to other forms of non-cognitivism (such as emotivism and quasi-realism), as well as to all forms of cognitivism (including both moral realism and ethical subjectivism).

Since prescriptivism was introduced by philosopher R. M. Hare in his 1952 book The Language of Morals, it has been compared to emotivism and to the categorical imperative of Immanuel Kant. Unlike Kant, however, Hare does not invoke universalizability as a test of moral permissibility. Instead, he sees it as a consistency requirement that is built into the logic of moral language and helps to make moral thinking a rational enterprise.

What prescriptivists claim

Hare originally proposed prescriptivism as a kind of amendment to emotivism. Like emotivists, Hare believes that moral discourse is not primarily informative or fact-stating. But whereas emotivists claim that moral language is mainly intended to express feelings or to influence behavior, Hare believes that the central purpose of moral talk is to guide behavior by telling someone what to do. Its main purpose is to “prescribe” (recommend) a certain act, not to get someone to do that act or to express one's personal feelings or attitudes.

To illustrate the prescriptivist view, consider the moral sentence, “Suicide is wrong.” According to moral realism, such a sentence claims there to be some objective property of “wrongness” associated with the act of suicide.  According to some versions of emotivism, such a sentence merely expresses an attitude of the speaker; it only means something like “Boo on suicide!”, but according to prescriptivism, the statement “Suicide is wrong” means something more like “Do not commit suicide.”. What it expresses is thus not primarily a description or an emotion, but an imperative. General value terms like “good”, “bad”, “right”, “wrong” and “ought” usually also have descriptive and emotive meanings, but these are not its primary meanings according to prescriptivists.

Criticisms

Prescriptivism has been widely criticized and has few adherents today. Many ethicists reject Hare's claim that moral language is not informative—that the purpose of moral talk is not to express moral truths or moral facts. Numerous critics also question Hare's contention that providing guidance is always the main purpose of moral talk. Hare appears to some to assume that moral language is always used in a context of discussion, debate, or command in which one person is telling another person, or persons, what to do. This, it is claimed, ignores the fact that moral talk is a “language-game” that is used for a wide variety of purposes. Finally, many critics have argued that prescriptivism conflicts with the commonsense distinction between good and bad reasons for moral beliefs. According to Hare, a racist “fanatic” who claims that all minority-group members should be deported, and is willing to stick with this consistently (e.g., even if the racist herself were a member of the minority group), cannot be faulted for either irrationality or falsehood. Ethics, for Hare, is thus ultimately a matter of non-rational choice and commitment. Many of Hare's critics object that reason does and should play a larger role in ethics than he recognizes.

See also 
 Non-cognitivism

Notes

References

External links
 Moral Cognitivism vs. Non-Cognitivism in the Stanford Encyclopedia of Philosophy
 Universal Prescriptivism FAQ

Meta-ethics